Seven Minutes to Midnight may refer to:

 Doomsday Clock, a symbolic clock face, representing a countdown to possible global catastrophe
 "Seven Minutes to Midnight" (Heroes), an episode of the science fiction drama series Heroes
 "Seven Minutes to Midnight" (song), a song by Pete Wylie's Wah! Heat